Astatotilapia desfontainii is a species of cichlid found in Algeria and Tunisia. It is found in freshwater spring, irrigated land, and canals and ditches. It is threatened by habitat loss.  This species reaches a length of  TL.

References

desfontainii
Cichlid fish of Africa
Fish of North Africa
Fish described in 1802
Taxonomy articles created by Polbot
Taxobox binomials not recognized by IUCN